Kim Young-bin (Hangul: 김영빈; born 8 April 1984) is a retired South Korean footballer who plays as defender for Gyeongnam FC.

References

1984 births
Living people
Association football defenders
South Korean footballers
Incheon United FC players
Gimcheon Sangmu FC players
Gyeongnam FC players
K League 1 players